The Webster Boy is a 1962 Irish film directed by Don Chaffey and written by Ted Allan and Leo Marks.

Cast
Richard O'Sullivan as Jimmy Webster
John Cassavetes as Vance Miller
Elizabeth Sellars as Margaret Webster
David Farrar as Paul Webster
Geoffrey Bayldon as Charles Jamieson
Niall MacGinnis as Headmaster
Harry Brogan as Grant
Seymour Cassel as Vic

References

External links
 

1962 films
1962 drama films
Irish black-and-white films
Films directed by Don Chaffey
Irish drama films
1960s English-language films